The  was an electric multiple unit (EMU) train type operated by the private railway operator Keikyu on commuter services in the Tokyo area of Japan from 1982 until 2018. Originally introduced to replace the earlier 600 series sets on limited-stop  services, they were rebuilt with an additional pair of doors per side and longitudinal seating from 1998 for reassignment to regular commuter services.

Formations
, the fleet consisted of five eight-car sets and one four-car set (classified 2400 series). The last remaining four-car set was withdrawn from service in October 2016.

8-car sets
The eight-car sets are formed as follows, with six motored (M) cars and two trailer (T) cars.

 The "x" in the car numbers corresponds to the set number.
 The two "M2" cars are each fitted with two lozenge-type pantographs.

4-car sets
The four-car sets were formed as follows, with three motored (M) cars and one trailer (T) car.

 The "x" in the car numbers corresponded to the set number.
 The "M2" cars were fitted with two lozenge-type pantographs.

Liveries
When delivered, the sets were initially painted in vermillion red with white around the side windows. From 1998, when converted to regular commuter use, they were repainted into all-over vermillion red with a white bodyside stripe.

From January 2013, set 2011 was repainted into the original livery of vermillion with white window surrounds to mark the 30th anniversary of the 2000 series. It remained in this livery for approximately two years.

Interior

History
The 2000 series was awarded the 1983 Blue Ribbon Award, presented annually by the Japan Railfan Club for the most outstanding train design of the year.

Withdrawal
Withdrawals commenced in 2012, with three of the four-car sets withdrawn in May 2012. Two more four-car sets were withdrawn in March 2016, leaving just set 2451 in service, until it was withdrawn following its last day in service on 11 October 2016.

In 2018, the remaining 2000 series began to be withdrawn, with the last set, set 2011, making its final run on 29 March 2018.

References

External links

 Keikyu 2000 series official information 

Electric multiple units of Japan
2000 series
Train-related introductions in 1982
Tokyu Car multiple units
Kawasaki multiple units
1500 V DC multiple units of Japan